Fred, Frederick or Freddy Gardner may refer to:

Fred Gardner (activist), American activist and author
Fred Gardner (cricketer) (1922–1979), English cricketer and footballer
Fred Gardner (rugby league) (1909–1999), Australian rugby league footballer
Freddy Gardner (1910–1950), British jazz musician
Frederick D. Gardner (1869–1933), American coffin and hearse manufacturer and governor of Missouri
Frederick Leigh Gardner (1857–1930), British occultist

See also
Fred Gardiner, Canadian politician
Frederick Gardiner (radiologist) (1874–1933), Scottish radiologist
Gardner (surname)
Gardiner (surname)